Portnahaven (meaning river port) is a village on Islay in the Inner Hebrides, Scotland. The village is within the parish of Kilchoman. In 1991 it had a population of 150.

It is located at the southern tip of the Rinns at the southern end of the A847 road. The A847 follows the coast from Portnahaven to Port Charlotte and Bridgend. Its harbour is sheltered by the island of Orsay and its smaller neighbour Eilean Mhic Coinnich. The Rinns of Islay lighthouse, built by Stevenson is located on Orsay. Portnahaven is served by a church, one shop which is also a post office, and a public house, An Tigh Seinnse. The church is one of the Telford Churches. The harbour around which the village is built provides the opportunity to observe grey seals at close quarters. The village of Port Wemyss is located just to the south of Portnahaven.

North of Portnahaven, at Claddach, is the world's first operational wave power machine. The "Islay LIMPET", constructed by Wavegen, became operational in 2000.

Nearby settlements include the village of Nerabus.

References

External links

Photographs and brief description

Villages in Islay